U.S. Highway 12 (US 12) is a  United States Numbered Highway in west- and east-central Minnesota, which travels from the South Dakota state line at Ortonville near Big Stone Lake and continues east to the St. Croix River at the Wisconsin state line. US 12 connects the cities of Ortonville, Benson, Willmar, Litchfield, Minneapolis, and Saint Paul.

Route description
From the South Dakota state line at Ortonville, to Orono in Minneapolis–Saint Paul, US 12 is mostly a rural two-lane highway with a  posted speed limit, with slower speed limits through towns and a four-lane surface arterial segment through the city of Willmar. From Orono to Wayzata, US 12 is a two-lane freeway/super-two bypass around Long Lake. East of I-494 in Minnetonka, US 12 is invisibly concurrent with I-394 and I-94 through Minneapolis and Saint Paul to the Wisconsin state line at Hudson.

Legally, the Minnesota section of US 12 is defined as unmarked Constitutional / Legislative Routes 149, 26, and 10 in Minnesota Statutes §§ 161.115(80) and 161.114(2). US 12 is not marked with these legislative numbers along the actual highway.

History
US 12 was established on November 11, 1926. In 1929, the only sections paved were between Litchfield and Willmar and between Wayzata through Minneapolis–Saint Paul to Wisconsin. The entire route was paved by 1940. Beginning in the 1950s, older sections of US 12 that ran through city centers were replaced with bypasses.

From 2006 to 2008, the US 12 two-lane freeway bypass was constructed through Orono and Long Lake. The new bypass ties into the existing US 12 freeway at the western edge of Wayzata.

Major intersections

References

External links

12
 Minnesota
Transportation in Big Stone County, Minnesota
Transportation in Swift County, Minnesota
Transportation in Kandiyohi County, Minnesota
Transportation in Meeker County, Minnesota
Transportation in Wright County, Minnesota
Transportation in Hennepin County, Minnesota